Examiner or The Examiner may refer to:

Occupations
 Bank examiner, a kind of auditor
 Examiner (Roman Catholicism), a type of office in the Roman Catholic Church
 Examinership, a concept in Irish law
 Medical examiner
 Patent examiner
 Trademark examiner, an attorney employed by a government entity

Newspapers

Australia
 The Examiner (Kiama, New South Wales), a newspaper published in Kiama, New South Wales, Australia
The Examiner (Perth), a weekly newspaper published in two editions in south-eastern Perth, Australia
 The Examiner (Tasmania), a daily paper in Launceston, Tasmania, Australia
 The Daily Examiner, local newspaper in Grafton, New South Wales, Australia

Canada
 Westmount Examiner, a newspaper in Westmount, Quebec
 The Examiner (Toronto), a newspaper founded by Francis Hincks

United Kingdom
 The Examiner (1710–1714), an early 18th-century journal with contributions by Jonathan Swift
 The Examiner (1808–86), a weekly paper founded by Leigh and John Hunt in the UK, 1808
 Huddersfield Daily Examiner, a local newspaper in Huddersfield, Yorkshire

United States
 The Baltimore Examiner, a newspaper in Baltimore, Maryland
 The Examiner (Beaumont), a weekly paper in Beaumont, Texas
 The Examiner (Brooklyn), a Jewish weekly published from 1955 to 1956
 The Examiner (Missouri), in Independence, Missouri
 The Examiner, a morning newspaper merged into the Los Angeles Herald Examiner in 1962
 The San Francisco Examiner, a newspaper in San Francisco, California
Lake County Examiner in Lake County, Oregon
The Examiner (New York)

Other
 Irish Examiner in Cork, Ireland
 IT Examiner, an information technology magazine based in India

Websites
 Examiner.com, a network of websites publishing articles by citizen journalists
 The Washington Examiner, a political journalism website and weekly magazine